Hillcrest is an unincorporated community in New Castle County, Delaware, United States. Hillcrest is located east of Marsh Road between Delaware Route 3 and U.S. Route 13 Business, north of Edgemoor. It was established in 1903.

References 

Unincorporated communities in New Castle County, Delaware
Unincorporated communities in Delaware